Tony Lee Cloninger (August 13, 1940 – July 24, 2018) was an American professional baseball player and coach. He played in Major League Baseball as a right-handed pitcher from  through  for the Milwaukee / Atlanta Braves, Cincinnati Reds and the St. Louis Cardinals.

Playing career
A power pitcher, Cloninger compiled a career 113–97 record with 1,120 strikeouts and a 4.07 ERA in 1,767 innings pitched. He enjoyed his best year for the 1965 Braves, with career highs in wins (24), strikeouts (211), ERA (3.29), complete games (16), innings (279) and games started (40).

Regarded as a tough fireball pitcher, Cloninger also was a dangerous power hitter. He compiled a career batting average of .192, with 67 RBIs and 11 home runs, including five in the 1966 season.

On July 3, 1966, in the Braves' 17–3 win over the Giants at Candlestick Park in San Francisco, Cloninger helped his team's cause with two grand slams and nine RBIs, both of which still stand as Braves franchise single-game bests.  Cloninger became the first player in the National League, and remains the only pitcher, to hit two grand slams in the same game. Cloninger used a bat of teammate Denis Menke's to hit both of those big home runs, and they stood as the only two grand slams of his major league career.

Cloninger finished his career pitching with Cincinnati and St. Louis. He was acquired along with Clay Carroll and Woody Woodward by the Reds from the Atlanta Braves for Milt Pappas, Bob Johnson and Ted Davidson on June 11, 1968.

Coaching career
After retiring, Cloninger served as a bullpen coach for the New York Yankees (1992–2001), where he was a member of five American League champions and four World Series champion teams.

In 2002, he became the pitching coach for the Boston Red Sox, but was forced to step down in early 2003 when he underwent successful treatment for bladder cancer that had been diagnosed in spring training. In 2004, Cloninger became a player development consultant for the Red Sox, serving for almost 15 consecutive seasons until his death.

As Red Sox pitching coach, Cloninger was ejected from a game in 2002 against the Baltimore Orioles.  After two batters were hit by pitches, fights broke out and benches cleared.  At one point, Cloninger, age 61 at the time but not shying away from trouble, grabbed Orioles player Brook Fordyce in a headlock.

Death
Cloninger died on July 24, 2018, in Denver, North Carolina at the age of 77.

See also
 List of Major League Baseball single-game grand slam leaders
 List of Major League Baseball pitchers who have thrown an immaculate inning
 Baseball record holders

References

External links

Tony Cloninger at SABR (Baseball BioProject)

1940 births
2018 deaths
Atlanta Braves players
Baseball coaches from North Carolina
Baseball players from North Carolina
Boston Red Sox coaches
Cincinnati Reds players
Eau Claire Braves players
Jacksonville Braves players
Louisville Colonels (minor league) players
Major League Baseball bullpen coaches
Major League Baseball pitchers
Major League Baseball pitching coaches
Milwaukee Braves players
New York Yankees coaches
People from Cherryville, North Carolina
Richmond Braves players
St. Louis Cardinals players